Balut Bangan (also Romanized as Balūt Bangān, Balūţ Bangān, and Balūţ Bengān) is a village in Tayebi-ye Garmsiri-ye Jonubi Rural District, in the Central District of Kohgiluyeh County, Kohgiluyeh and Boyer-Ahmad Province, Iran. At the 2006 census, its population was 222, in 54 families.

References 

Populated places in Kohgiluyeh County